The western crowned warbler (Phylloscopus occipitalis) is a leaf warbler which breeds in Central Asia. It winters in the forests of the Western Ghats.

The nest is built in a hole, and the typical clutch is four eggs.

The species has a distinctive crown stripe and two wing-bars. It often moves in small flocks or in mixed hunting parties.

References

western crowned warbler
Birds of Afghanistan
Birds of Pakistan
Birds of Central Asia
Birds of North India
western crowned warbler
western crowned warbler